Andrey Arkhipaw (born 6 February 1995) is a Belarusian professional footballer.

References

External links 
 
 
 

1995 births
Living people
Belarusian footballers
Association football defenders
Belarusian expatriate footballers
Expatriate footballers in Poland
FC Luch Minsk (2012) players
FC Lida players